The 2020 World Single Distances Speed Skating Championships were held between February 13 and 16, 2020, at the Utah Olympic Oval in Salt Lake City, United States.

Schedule
All times are local (UTC−7).

Medal summary

Medal table

Men's events

Women's events

References

  
2020 Single Distances
2020 in speed skating
World Single Distances, 2020
2020 in American sports
2020 in sports in Utah
February 2020 sports events in the United States